The British Rail Class 419 Motor Luggage Vans (or MLV) were battery electric multiple unit cars built from 1951-61 by BR at Eastleigh Works.

Description
Each MLV unit is essentially a motorised BG carriage, with a driver's position at each end. Each vehicle has two luggage compartments and a guard's compartment.

Ten of these units were built for the boat trains from London Victoria to Dover and Folkestone. Units were originally numbered in the range 68001-68010, but were classified Class 419 under the TOPS system and were then renumbered 419001-419010, the numbers actually carried on the units in service reduced to 9001-9010, omitting the first two digits.

The units were able to work alone, hauling a limited load, or work in multiple with other EP-type rolling stock, usually in conjunction with Class 410 and Class 411. The units were also fitted with batteries to allow them to operate over the short-distance of non-electrified quayside lines at Dover and Folkestone. The batteries allowed the units to be used at low-speed for 20–30 minutes, and could be recharged when the unit was taking power from 750 V DC third-rail.

By 1963, it was discovered that one luggage carriage was insufficient for the boat train service. Some trains were operated with paired MLVs, which resulted in a shortage of the vehicles. To overcome the problem, six Trailer Luggage Vans (TLV) were introduced in 1968 and kept in use alongside the MLVs until 1975. These were numbered 68201-68206 as Class 499 and were conventional BG carriages, except for having their gangway ends sealed from use.

The MLVs were withdrawn from traffic in 1991-92, with the closure of Dover Western Docks railway station and the end of the boat train services.

Prototype
The design of the units was based on an earlier vehicle, numbered 68000, which was used as a parcels van on the Tyneside DC electrified network. When the South Tyneside network was de-electrified in 1967, the unit was initially transferred for use on the Southport to Liverpool electric line before being withdrawn.

Departmental service
After withdrawal from normal service, the entire fleet was transferred to departmental service as Class 931 tractor units. Unit 9006 was damaged in an accident at Ramsgate in 1994, resulting in it being withdrawn and subsequently scrapped. Units 9003 and 9009 were specially repainted in BR Blue and LSE "Jaffa Cake" liveries, by staff at  depot, to commemorate the closure of the depot in 1995.

Most of the units were withdrawn again in 1997. They were kept at Bournemouth depot, while they were waiting for disposal. While there, units 9001 and 9002 stayed in use as depot shunters. Unit 9001 was retired in 1998, and subsequently preserved. Unit 9002 was kept by South West Trains until 2004, when former 4CEP unit 1512 replaced it.

Preservation
All but two of the units have been preserved. One unit was scrapped after an accident whilst in service, and the other was scrapped in preservation.

The first unit to be preserved was first-built no. 9001, which was saved in 1998 after a campaign by the EPB Preservation Group. It was bought to power the group's preserved 2EPB unit, no. 5759.
The units dumped at Bournemouth were put out to tender in 1999, and were bought mainly for use as storage vehicles. Their ability to move under battery-power has also allowed limited passenger use.
The final unit to be saved was no. 9002, which has now been stored at Southall. After extensive overhaul at Southall 9002 ventured back onto the main line on 28 August 2015 when it was hauled by Battle Of Britain Class 34067 Tangmere to Ramsgate Depot for an open day, it returned a day later but has not been out since. The table below gives details of the current locations and fates of the Class 419 units.

Fleet details

Models
A OO gauge model of the Class 419 MLV has been produced by Bachmann Branchline.

Notes

References

Sources

Further reading

External links

The Southern E-Group page on the Class 419s or MLVs.
EPB Preservation Group - owners of preserved units 9001 and 9002.
Eden Valley Railway - owners of preserved units 9003 and 9005.

419
Non-passenger multiple units
Train-related introductions in 1959
750 V DC multiple units